The Canterbury Cross is one of the crosses that are used to symbolise the Christian faith.  It is so called because it was designed after a Saxon brooch, dating c. 850 that was found in 1867 in Canterbury, England.

General
The original cross, kept at the Beaney House of Art and Knowledge, is a bronze cruciform brooch, with triangular panels of silver, incised with a triquetra and inlaid with niello. This cross features a small square in the centre, from which extend four arms, wider on the outside, so that the arms look like triangles, symbolising the Trinity.  The tips of the arms are arcs of a single circle, giving the overall effect of a round wheel.

As a stone cross is erected at Canterbury Cathedral and the crosses are sold at the souvenir shop there, the Canterbury Cross is familiar to those who made pilgrimage there. It is sometimes used as a symbol to represent the Anglican Communion. For example, in 1932, a Canterbury Cross made up of pieces of stone from Canterbury was sent to each of the Anglican diocesan cathedrals of the world as a visible symbol of the communion with Canterbury.

See also
 Cross
 Canterbury Cathedral
 Anglican Communion
 Table Plus

References

Cross symbols
Anglicanism